Arhopala muta  (mutal oakblue) is a species of butterfly belonging to the lycaenid family described by William Chapman Hewitson in 1862. It is found in  Southeast Asia (Thailand, Burma, Mergui, Peninsular Malaya, Thailand, Java, Sumatra, Borneo)

Subspecies
Arhopala muta muta (Java)
Arhopala muta trima Corbet, 1941 (Sumatra)
Arhopala muta maranda Corbet, 1941 (Peninsular Malaysia, Thailand)
Arhopala muta wallacei Corbet, 1941 (Sumatra)
Arhopala muta waterstradti Bethune-Baker, 1896 (Borneo)
Arhopala muta merguiana Corbet, 1941 (Thailand, Burma, Mergui)
Arhopala muta gloria (Evans, 1957) (Nias)

References

External links
"Arhopala Boisduval, 1832" at Markku Savela's Lepidoptera and Some Other Life Forms

Arhopala
Butterflies described in 1862
Butterflies of Asia
Taxa named by William Chapman Hewitson